Dullas Daham Kumara Alahapperuma (born May 14, 1959) is a Sri Lankan politician and founder and current leader of the Freedom People's Congress. Alahapperuma is also a former Cabinet Minister of Information and Mass Media and a current Member of Parliament from the Matara District.

Early life
Alahapperuma was born on 14 May 1959 in Dikwella, Matara to Carolis Alahapperuma and Aslin Alahapperuma, who were principals of local schools. Alahapperuma received his primary and secondary education at St. Servatius' College and Ananda College. He studied Political Science at the University of Iowa, for one and half years, but did not complete the political science degree

Political career 
Alahapperuma started his career as a journalist, he worked at Lakmina before joining Divaina as an editor. He entered Parliament for the first time in 1994 after topping the Matara preferential vote as a People's Alliance candidate with 76,678 votes.

He got re-elected in 2000 and served in the short tenure of the 11th Parliament. He was also appointed as Deputy Minister of Samurdhi, Rural Development, Parliamentary Affairs & Up-country Development. He surprisingly decided not to contest in the 2001 General Election. He said he was 'too white' to be in the parliament referring to corruption.

He re-entered 13th Parliament as a UPFA national list MP on 19 December 2005 to the vacant seat following the assassination of then Foreign Minister Lakshman Kadirgamar. He was appointed as the Minister of Transport in 2007.

He re-entered Parliament in 2010 as a national list MP representing UPFA following the 2010 General Election and was subsequently appointed as Minister of Youth Affairs. He voted in favour of the Eighteenth Amendment which gave the Executive President a wide range of powers including removing the term limit for re-election. In 2015, he voted in favour of the Nineteenth Amendment under President Sirisena which curtailed Presidential powers.

He contested the 2015 General Election as a UPFA candidate from Matara district and received 105,406 votes to enter Parliament. In August 2016, he resigned from the Matara District SLFP leadership post. In 2019, He was appointed as the Minister of Sports along with two other portfolios of Ministries of Education and Youth Affairs.

Alahapperuma contested the 2020 General Election as a SLPP candidate from the Matara district and received 103,534 votes to enter Parliament. He voted in favour of Twentieth Amendment which repealed 19th Amendment and restored more powers to the Executive President. In August 2020, Alahapperuma was appointed Minister of Power. In the August 2021 Cabinet reshuffle, he was appointed Minister of Mass Media. He resigned from his cabinet portfolio in April 2022 as the 2022 Sri Lankan political crisis deepened amid civil protests.

In July 2022, following the resignation of President Gotabaya Rajapaksa, Alahapperuma announced that he would run for president in the upcoming presidential  election to elect Gotabaya Rajapaksa’s  successor. Alahapperuma was backed by Leader of the Opposition Sajith Premadasa and SLPP Chairman and MP Professor G. L. Peiris. Alahapperuma lost the election to acting president Ranil Wickremesinghe.

On 31 August, 2022, Dullas Alahapperuma and 13 others left the Sri Lanka Podujana Peramuna party and crossed over to the opposition as an independent MP. Two days later, Alahapperuma's faction launched a new political party, the Freedom People's Congress. The faction is expected to contest in the upcoming local government elections as part of the Freedom People's Alliance, a political alliance also including the SLFP and the Supreme Lanka Coalition.

Family
He is married to popular singer Pradeepa Dharmadasa, daughter of P.K and Hema Dharmadasa of Galle, and has two children.

See also
 Cabinet of Sri Lanka

References

External links
 Sri Lanka Parliament profile

1959 births
Living people
Alumni of Ananda College
Government ministers of Sri Lanka
Sri Lankan Buddhists
Provincial councillors of Sri Lanka
Members of the 10th Parliament of Sri Lanka
Members of the 11th Parliament of Sri Lanka
Members of the 13th Parliament of Sri Lanka
Members of the 14th Parliament of Sri Lanka
Members of the 15th Parliament of Sri Lanka
Members of the 16th Parliament of Sri Lanka
Sinhalese politicians
Candidates in the 2022 Sri Lankan presidential election